Agyneta natalensis is a species of sheet weaver found in South Africa. It was described by Jocque in 1984.

References

Endemic fauna of South Africa
natalensis
Spiders of South Africa
Spiders described in 1984